Mopan may refer to:

Mopán language, a Mayan language spoken in Belize and Guatemala
Mopan people, an indigenous Maya people, whose native language is Mopan
Mopan River, in Belize's Cayo district
SS Mopan, a British cargo liner intercepted and sunk by the German battleship Admiral Scheer on November 5, 1940
Multilateral Organisation Performance Assessment Network (MOPAN), a special body of the Organisation for Economic Co-operation and Development (OECD)

See also
 Mopane (disambiguation)
 Mopani (disambiguation)